Lahiru Jayaratne (born 12 October 1991) is a Sri Lankan cricketer. He made his first-class debut for Ragama Cricket Club in the 2011–12 Premier Trophy on 4 March 2012.

References

External links
 

1991 births
Living people
Sri Lankan cricketers
Kurunegala Youth Cricket Club cricketers
Ragama Cricket Club cricketers
Basnahira Cricket Dundee cricketers
People from Central Province, Sri Lanka